Calomnion is a genus of mosses in the family Rhizogoniaceae. They have been reported from Australia, New Zealand, Polynesia, Melanesia, New Guinea, and eastern Indonesia.

Classification
The genus was originally placed within its own family, the Calomniaceae, with the genus Nadeaudia. Nadeudia contained one species, Nadeaudia schistostegiella, which is now considered a synonym for Calomnion schistostegiellum.

Species included in the genus are:
Calomnion brownseyi Vitt & H.A. Mill.
Calomnion ceramense Vitt
Calomnion complanatum (Hook. f. & Wilson) Lindb. (type species)
Calomnion denticulatum Mitt.
Calomnion iwatsukii Vitt
Calomnion lillianiae Vitt & H.A. Mill.
Calomnion melanesicum H.A. Mill.
Calomnion milleri Vitt
Calomnion schistostegiellum (Besch.) Wijk & Margad.

References

Moss genera
Rhizogoniales
Taxa named by Joseph Dalton Hooker